Mija may refer to:

Mija Aleksić (1923–1995), a Serbian actor
Mija Mare, a tributary of the river Jieț in Romania
Mija Martina (born 1984), a singer from Bosnia and Herzegovina
Mija Mică, a tributary of the river Jieț in Romania
Mija (DJ) (born 1992), a DJ from Phoenix
Mija, a village in I. L. Caragiale Commune, Dâmbovița County, Romania

See also
Mi-ja, Korean feminine given name